Alchornea castaneifolia (iporuru, iporoni, iporuro, ipururo, ipurosa, macochihua, niando, pajaro; syn. Hermesia castaneifolia Humb. & Bonpl. ex Willd.) is a medicinal plant native to Amazon Rainforest vegetation in Brazil.

Traditional medicine 

For centuries the indigenous peoples of the Amazon have used the bark and leaves of iporuru (Alchornea castaneifolia) for many different purposes and prepared it in many different ways. The Alchornea castaneifolia plant commonly is used with other plants during shamanistic training and, sometimes is an ingredient in ayahuasca (a hallucinogenic, multi-herb decoction used by South American shamans). Throughout the Amazon the bark or leaves of iporuro are tinctured (generally with the local rum, called aguardiente) as a local remedy for rheumatism, arthritis, colds, and muscle pains.  Iporuro (Alchornea castaneifolia) is well known to the indigenous peoples of Peru for relieving the symptoms of osteoarthritis, and in aiding flexibility and range of motion. The Candochi-Shapra and the Shipibo Indian tribes use both the bark and roots of iporuro for rheumatism.  To prevent diarrhea, members of the Tikuna tribe take one tablespoon of Alchornea castaneifolia bark decoction before meals. The pain-relieving properties of iporuru appear in topical treatments.  Crushed leaves are rubbed on painful joints and are beaten into a paste to apply to painful stingray wounds.

Little research has been done to catalog completely the phytochemicals in iporuru. Initial screening has revealed it to contain steroids, saponins, alkaloids and natural phenols (flavonols, flavones, tannins, xanthonoids).

The putative anti-inflammatory properties of iporuru are attributed to a group of alkaloids, including one called alchorneine, which are found in the bark of iporuru as well as several other species of Alchornea.

References

External links

Tropical Plant Database: Alchornea castaneifolia

Alchorneae
Ayahuasca
Flora of the Amazon
Medicinal plants of South America
Trees of Peru
Trees of Brazil
Taxa named by Aimé Bonpland